Tyler Jamal "T. J." Finley (born March 25, 2002) is an American football quarterback for the Auburn Tigers. Finley attended and played high school football at Ponchatoula High School in Tangipahoa Parish, Louisiana and began his college career at LSU before transferring to Auburn the following year.

Early years
Finley grew up in Ponchatoula, Louisiana and attended Ponchatoula High School. He passed for 2,736 yards with 23 touchdowns and five interceptions in his junior season. As a senior, Finley passed for 2,738 yards and 21 touchdowns and also scored eight rushing touchdowns. Finley was rated a three-star prospect and the best quarterback prospect in the state and committed to play college football at LSU as a sophomore in high school over offers from Oregon, Alabama, and Auburn.

College career

LSU
Finley enrolled at LSU a semester early in January 2020. He was named the Tigers' starting quarterback leading up to team's October 24, 2020, game against South Carolina following an injury to starter Myles Brennan. In his first career start, Finley completed 17 of 21 pass attempts for 265 yards with two touchdowns and an interception and rushed for 24 yards and a touchdown. Finley started five games and finished the season with 80-of-140 passes for 941 yards with five touchdowns and five interceptions.

After competing with quarterbacks Myles Brennan and Max Johnson in spring practice, Finley announced he would be entering the transfer portal.

Auburn
On May 24, 2021, Finley announced that he would be transferring to Auburn over offers from Alabama, Penn State, and Houston. On September 25, 2021, Finley would come in in the fourth quarter for a benched Bo Nix and throw the game winning touchdown versus Georgia State. Finley was named Auburn's starting quarterback for the Tigers opening game of the 2022 season.

Statistics

References

External links
 Auburn Tigers bio
 LSU Tigers bio

2002 births
Living people
Players of American football from Louisiana
American football quarterbacks
LSU Tigers football players
Auburn Tigers football players